The buff-throated foliage-gleaner (Automolus ochrolaemus) is a species of bird in the family Furnariidae.

It is found in Belize, Bolivia, Brazil, Colombia, Costa Rica, Ecuador, French Guiana, Guatemala, Guyana, Honduras, Mexico, Nicaragua, Panama, Peru, Suriname, and Venezuela. Its natural habitats are subtropical or tropical moist lowland forest and subtropical or tropical swampland.

References

Further reading

buff-throated foliage-gleaner
Birds of Central America
Birds of the Amazon Basin
Birds of Colombia
Birds of Ecuador
Birds of the Guianas
buff-throated foliage-gleaner
Taxonomy articles created by Polbot